Cefovecin (INN) is an antibiotic of the cephalosporin class, licensed for the treatment of skin infections in cats and dogs. It is marketed by Zoetis under the trade name Convenia. It is used to treat skin infections caused by Pasteurella multocida in cats, and Staphylococcus intermedius and Streptococcus canis in dogs. The advantage of using a long-acting injectable antibiotic is that, unlike with daily administration, doses cannot be missed, which may allow partially resistant microbes to recover. The disadvantage is the presence of subtherapeutic concentrations in the weeks after the resolution of infections.  This is associated with the development of resistance in microbes. It should not be used in pregnant or lactating animals or in animals with a history of allergies to penicillin or cephalosporin drugs.

Medical uses

Cefovecin is a broad-spectrum, third-generation cephalosporin antibiotic administered by subcutaneous injection. It is used to treat skin and soft tissue infections in dogs and cats. The antimicrobial effects last for 14 days following administration.

In drug studies, cefovecin administered to dogs was 92.4% effective against skin infections (secondary superficial pyoderma, abscesses, and infected wounds). In cats, it was 96.8% effective against skin infections.

Contraindications
Contraindications include known allergies to cefovecin or antibiotics containing β-lactam rings such as penicillin or cephalosporins. Adverse reactions can include anaphylaxis. It is not for use in humans and should be kept out of reach of children. People with similar known allergies should avoid dermal contact when handling cefovecin.

Adverse effects

In dogs, adverse effects may include lethargy, decreased appetite, vomiting, diarrhea, blood in feces, and flatulence. In cats, adverse reactions may include vomiting, diarrhea, decreased appetite, lethargy, odd hyperactive behavior, and inappropriate urination. Mildly increased serum alanine transaminase (ALT) and gamma-glutamyltransferase may also occur.

Other reported events in dogs and cats include death, tremors/ataxia, seizures, anaphylaxis, acute pulmonary edema, facial edema, injection site reactions (alopecia, scabs, necrosis, and erythema), hemolytic anemia, salivation, pruritus, lethargy, vomiting, diarrhea, and inappetence.

Pharmacology

Mechanism of action
Cefovecin interferes with the synthesis of bacterial cell walls, by binding to penicillin binding proteins. Due to high protein-binding, it is not effective against species of Pseudomonas or Enterococcus. The maximum anti-bacterial activity occurs approximately two days after cefovecin has been administered.

Pharmacokinetics
In the dog, the half-life of cefovecin is 5.5 days, and in the cat, it is 6.9 days. In birds and reptiles, the half-life is only a few hours, much shorter than in dogs and cats. In cats, 99% of cefovecin is bound to proteins in the blood plasma.

Society and culture
Cefovecin was first authorized for use in the European Union in June 2006, and was approved for use in the United States in June 2008.

References

External links 
  - Cefovecin sodium

Cephalosporin antibiotics
Dog medications
Cat medications
Tetrahydrofurans
Thiazoles
Ketoximes